South Korean girl group Girl's Day has released two studio albums, one compilation album, seven extended plays, and twenty singles. The group debuted on July 7, 2010 with the EP Girl's Day Party #1, with the song "Tilt My Head" as their first single.

Albums

Studio albums

Compilation albums

Reissues

Extended plays

Singles

Other charted songs

Soundtracks

Collaborations
The following releases are in Korean, unless otherwise specified.

Videography

Music videos

Notes

References 

Discographies of South Korean artists
Discography
K-pop music group discographies